

The Bleriot-SPAD S.51 was a French fighter aircraft developed in 1924 in response to a French Air Force requirement for an aircraft to replace their obsolete Nieuport-Delage NiD.29s.

Design and development

Designed by André Herbemont, the S.51 shared its basic configuration with his other aircraft of the period, being a biplane with a swept upper wing and unswept lower wing, joined by I-shaped interplane struts. Unlike earlier designs, the S.51 used metal construction for the wings.

The prototype S.51 was rejected by the French authorities, but revised versions found export customers in the Polish Air Force, which bought 50 of them, and the Turkish and Soviet air forces which each bought a single example. Another development, the S.51/3, was experimentally fitted with the first controllable-pitch propeller developed in France, also designed by Herbemont.

Variants
S.51
Prototype for French evaluation, 1x  Gnome et Rhône 9Aa radial engine.
S.51/2
Refined version exported to Poland, 1x  Gnome et Rhône 9Ab radial engine.
S.51/3
Prototype with variable-pitch propeller.
S.51/4
Export version for Turkey and the USSR with two extra machine guns in the wings.

Operators

Polish Air Force
 11th (Kościuszko) Squadron

Soviet Air Force – One aircraft, used for tests and trials.

Spanish Republican Air Force

Turkish Air Force

Specifications (S.51/2)

See also

References

Bibliography

External links

1920s French fighter aircraft
Blériot aircraft
Single-engined tractor aircraft
Biplanes
Aircraft first flown in 1924